Taoyuan HSR is a high-speed rail and metro station in Zhongli District, Taoyuan, Taiwan, served by Taiwan High Speed Rail and Taoyuan Airport MRT, and is also known as Qingpu Station.

History
 10 November 2006: This station opened for service.
 05 January 2007: The segment from the Banqiao to Zuoying opened for service and trains began stopping at this station.
 02 March 2017:  The Taoyuan Airport MRT opened for service connecting the station to the now completed Taoyuan Metro line.

The Taiwan High Speed Rail Corporation signed contracts with China Airlines for preferential services at this station for the airline's outbound passengers.

HSR station layout
The Taiwan High Speed Rail section of the station is underground with two side platforms. Prior to the abolition of Taoyuan Air Force Base, Taoyuan Air Force Base had set an altitude limit for the construction of Taiwan High Speed Rail, which is why the high-speed rail station is underground.

Prior to the opening of Taiwan High Speed Rail, the area this station is located in, Qingpu, was very deserted and distant from Central Taoyuan. This has begun to change after the opening of Taiwan High Speed Rail, with major developments such as the opening of a new outlet mall, an IKEA store, and an indoor aquarium. Twenty-two hectares around the station are reserved for commercial and industrial development, with the goal of developing the area into an international commercial city.

Taoyuan Airport MRT station layout
The Taoyuan Airport MRT section of the station is elevated with two side platforms.

HSR services
HSR services 295, (1)3xx, (1)5xx, (1)6xx, and (8)8xx call at this station.

Around the station
 National Central University
 Ching Yun University
 Vanung University
 Taiwan Taoyuan International Airport (17 minutes by MRT)
 National Highway No. 2 Dazhu Interchange
 Metro Walk Mall
 Liqingpu Elementary School
 Taoyuan International Baseball Stadium
 Taiwan High Speed Rail Museum

References

Railway stations opened in 2006
Railway stations served by Taiwan High Speed Rail
Zhongli District
Railway stations in Taoyuan City
2006 establishments in Taiwan
Taoyuan Airport MRT stations